Tabernaemontana amplifolia is a species of plant in the family Apocynaceae. It is found in Colombia and Ecuador.

References

amplifolia